Magyar Testgyakorlók Köre is a multi-sports club from Budapest, founded in 1888. It has sections for football, handball, basketball, volleyball, futsal, ice hockey, water polo, cycling, gymnastics, athletics, fencing, canoeing, boxing, wrestling, swimming, rowing, karate, taekwondo, sailing, speed skating, skiing, table tennis, tennis and chess.

Departments

Team sports
 Football:
 men's football (since 1888)
 women's football (since 2004)
 Handball:
 women's handball (1946–1975, 1993–2000, since 2013)
 Basketball:
 women's handball (1945–1997, since 2011)
 Volleyball:
 women's volleyball (since 1947)

Individual sports
 Athletics (since 1888)
 Boxing (1893–1914, 1922– , since 1951)
 Bridge (since 1933)
 Canoing (since 1951)
 Chess
 Gymnastics
 Fencing (since 1908)
 Judo (since 2019)
 Karate (since 2010)
 Rowing (1895–1942, since 1947)
 Rhythmic gymnastics (since 2011)
 Swimming (1892–1958, since 1962)
 Skating
 Taekwondo (since 1989)
 Tennis (1930–, 1947–, since 1991)
 E-sports

Dissolved departments
 Auto-motor (1926–1953)
 Bandy
 Basketball
 men's basketball
 Button football
 Cycling
 Field hockey
 Futsal
 Handball
 men's handball (1924–1958)
 Ice hockey
 Sailing
 Skiing
 Water polo
 Weightlifting (1934–?, 195?–?, 196?–1966)
 Wrestling

Supporters and rivalries

Supporters

Notable supporters
 Sándor Demján, businessman and entrepreneur
 Károly Gesztesi, actor
 Zoltán Zelk, poet
 Gábor Várszegi, musician and businessman

Rivalry

The fixture between MTK Budapest FC and Ferencvárosi TC is called the Örökrangadó or Eternal derby. The first fixture was played in the 1903 Nemzeti Bajnokság I season. It is the oldest football rivalry in Hungary.

Honours

Active departments

Football (men's)

Hungarian Championship
Winners (23): 1904, 1907–08, 1913–14, 1916–17, 1917–18, 1918–19, 1919–20, 1920–21, 1921–22, 1922–23, 1923–24, 1924–25, 1928–29, 1935–36, 1936–37, 1950, 1953, 1957–58, 1986–87, 1996–97, 1998–99, 2002–03, 2007–08
Hungarian Second League
 Winners (4): 1994–95, 2011–12, 2017–18, 2019–20
Hungarian Cup
Winners (12): 1909–10, 1910–11, 1911–12, 1913–14, 1922–23, 1924–25, 1931–32, 1951–52, 1968, 1996–97, 1997–98, 1999–00
Hungarian Super Cup (defunct)
Winners (2): 2003, 2008
Hungarian League Cup (defunct)
Winners (2): 2012–13, 2014–15

Mitropa Cup (defunct)
Winners (2): 1955, 1963
Štefánik Tournament (defunct)
Winner (1): 1933

Basketball (women's)

Hungarian Championship
Winners (10): 1953, 1956, 1961–62, 1962–63, 1964, 1965, 1966, 1968, 1969, 1972, 1988–89, 1990–91
Hungarian Cup
Winners (8): 1955, 1961–62, 1964, 1965, 1967, 1968, 1969, 1972

Football (women's)

Hungarian Championship
Winners (8): 2004–05, 2009–10, 2010–11, 2011–12, 2012–13, 2013–14, 2016–17, 2017–18
Hungarian Cup
Winners (4): 2005, 2010, 2013, 2014

International honours

Notable former players

Olympic champions
Az MTK olimpiai bajnokainak listája

 Zoltán Halmay, swimming
 Richárd Weisz, wrestling (Greco-Roman)
 Márton Homonnai, water polo
 Ferenc Keserű, water polo
 Jenő Brandi, water polo
 Kálmán Hazai, water polo
 László Papp, boxing
 Imre Hódos, wrestling (Greco-Roman)
 Róbert Antal, water polo
 Nándor Hidegkuti, football
 Imre Kovács, football
 Mihály Lantos, football
 Péter Palotás, football
 József Zakariás, football
 Gyula Török, boxing
 Lajos Dunai, football
 István Sárközi, football
 Ildikó Tordasi, fencing (foil)
 Botond Storcz, canoe sprint
 Katalin Kovács, canoe sprint

Presidents 
List of the presidents of the MTK Budapest:

 1889–1891: Lajos Vermes
 1892–1898: Gyula Porzsolt
 1899–1903: Antal Heteés
 1905–1944: Alfréd Brüll
 1945–1949: Zoltán Vass
 1951–1953: János Somogyi
 1953–1954: Lajos Kovács
 1954–1956: István Tóth
 1959–1963: István Dénes
 1963–1969: Ferenc Bánhalmi
 1969–1971: György Krekács
 1971–2000: János Fekete
 2001–2002: István Harcsár
 2002–2003: Csaba Szecső
 2004–2010: György Hunvald
 since 2010: Tamás Deutsch

References

External links 

 Official website 

Multi-sport clubs in Hungary
Sport in Budapest
Sports clubs established in 1888
1888 establishments in Hungary